This is a list of flag bearers who have represented Colombia at the Olympics.

Flag bearers carry the national flag of their country at the opening ceremony of the Olympic Games.

See also
Colombia at the Olympics

References

Colombia at the Olympics
Colombia
Olympic